The Waco A series is a range of light American-built twin side-by-side seater sporting biplanes of the early 1930s.

Development

The Waco A series was introduced in 1932 as an affordable private-owner aircraft with cross-country range and baggage capacity and a more sporting image than the larger Waco F series. The A series offered a number of engine options which had varying sub-designations. The power range lay between the KBA with a  Kinner engine and the later UBA with a  Continental powerplant.

The PLA "Sportsman" of 1933 introduced a longer wider fuselage and a higher useful load and had a  Jacobs LA-1 radial engine. The last model in the series was the ULA, also of 1933, with a  powerplant.

Operational history

The A series was bought mainly by private pilot owners with a sporting inclination.  Relatively few were produced and the type survives in small numbers in 2009. A PBA is on display in the Historic Aircraft Restoration Museum at Dauster Field near St Louis, Missouri.

Variants
Data from Aerofiles

BA series
BBA  Wright J-5 - none produced
KBA  Kinner K-5 - one built
IBA  Kinner B-5 - three built including one conversion
PBA  Jacobs LA-1 - six built
RBA  later  Warner Scarab - 4 built
TBA  Kinner R-5 - none built
UBA  Continental R-670 - at least 6 built

CA series
KCA  Kinner K-5 - possibly none built
PCA  Jacobs LA-1 - possibly none built
RCA  Warner Scarab - possibly none built
TCA  Kinner R-5 - none built
UCA  Continental R-670 - none built

LA series
PLA Sportsman 
 longer and wider fuselage and  Jacobs LA-1 - 4 built
ULA Sportsman
 as PLA with  Continental R-670 - 1 built

Specifications (RBA variant)

References

Notes

Bibliography

1930s United States civil utility aircraft
A series
Biplanes
Single-engined tractor aircraft